Yaacov Behrman is an American rabbi, the Director of Operation Survival, a project of the National Committee for the Furtherance of Jewish Education (N.C.F.J.E), and a liaison for Chabad Headquarters. Behrman is also the founder of the Jewish Future Alliance, and a member of Community Board 9.  In 2021, Mayor Eric Adams named Behrman to his mayoral transition team.

Education

Behrman was ordained by the former Chief Rabbi of Israel, Rav Mordechai Eliyahu, and Rabbi Zelig Sharfstein, Chief Rabbi of the Vaad Ho'ir of Cincinnati. He earned his M.A. degree in Educational Leadership from Bellevue University, and is a New York State Certified Prevention Professional and Gambling Specialty Designation.

Activism
Behrman is a social activist who has advanced race relations in New York. He served on De Blasio's multi-ethnic interfaith Neighborhood Safety Coalition, and was a member of the Kings County Democratic County Committee from 2018-2022. In April 2022, Rabbi Behrman and the Jewish Future Alliance co-sponsored the first Glatt Kosher Iftar Meal in Crown Heights. The event advanced Muslim-Jewish relations, and created further dialogue between Chassidic Jews in Brooklyn, and their Muslim neighbors.

Behrman has served on Community Board 9 since 2015. He is the former Chair of CB9's Public Safety Committee, and Environmental Protection Committee. He is also a former ULURP Committee member and Education Committee member.    

Behrman is considered a political moderate, and is in regular contact with New York and national politicians regarding issues that effect the Jewish community. In 2021, Behrman put together a coalition of Jewish activists from the Crown Heights Jewish community, which gave New York City Mayor Eric Adams his first Orthodox Jewish community endorsement from Chassidic activists. This coalition was active in bringing out 4500 votes for Adams, and approximately 2500 votes for city council candidate Crystal Hudson. These voters likely provided the margin of victory for Crystal Hudson over socialist candidate Michael Hollingsworth.

Operation Survival

Operation Survival is a drug prevention program that provides evidence-based programming in local yeshivas and public schools and, in addition, provides classes and seminars for parents in drug prevention and mental health. Operation Survival played a leading role in educating the community on the opioid epidemic. NCFJE  was the first Jewish organization in New York State to launch an overdose prevention Naloxone training program. In recognition for Operation Survival's efforts to fight the Opioid Epidemic, Behrman was invited by New York Attorney General Letitia James, in October 2021, to stand with her as she began her statewide 'HealNY' tour to combat the opioid epidemic. The organization has been credited with working to bring the racially diverse community of Crown Heights together in common cause.

Chabad

Behrman is a director of media relations at Lubavitch International, the official news service of the Chabad movement, and a public relations liaison for Chabad Headquarters. He works with a global network of Chabad representatives, and occasionally acts as a Chabad spokesperson. He has also helped coordinate Chabad's response during times of crises. On the first anniversary of the Mumbai attacks, Chabad sent Behrman to Mumbai to help organize the memorial.

As a rabbinical student, Behrman, on behalf of Chabad of Central Africa, traveled to many countries in Africa  --  including Ghana, Nigeria, Angola, Ethiopia, Tanzania, Kenya and Equatorial Guinea -- to lead High Holiday and Passover services, and help with community development. Many of these countries now have permanent Chabad centers.  In 2011, as part of the official Chabad delegation, Behrman visited Kinshasa, in the Congo, to celebrate 20 years of Chabad's presence in Central Africa.

Awards 

In 2014, Behrman was named by the Jewish Week  as one of "36 Under 36"  for his activism, and for working to improve relations between the Jewish and African American communities in Crown Heights.

References 

 1982 births

Living people
Bellevue University alumni
21st-century American rabbis
Rabbis from New York City
Chabad-Lubavitch rabbis
 People from Crown Heights, Brooklyn
Jewish American people in New York (state) politics